Voyage ~Sans Retour~ (French: "Journey ~Without Return~) is the second album by Japanese rock band Malice Mizer, released on June 9, 1996. It is their first album with second vocalist Gackt.

Overview
Malice Mizer's singer and lyricist Tetsu left the group after a concert on December 27, 1994. After almost a year of inactivity, Malice Mizer recruited Gackt as their new vocalist and released the single "Uruwashiki Kamen no Shoutaijou" on December 10, 1995. With a new concept, the band's music became more art rock and synthpop, incorporating even stronger classical and electronic elements. Visually, they abandoned their 1980s goth look for colorful historical costumes with a gothic feel. It features an instrumental arrangement of a song from the days of the first vocalist, Tetsu. This is the first song to feature Gackt playing the piano and credited for the arrangement.

Voyage was released on June 9, 1996 by guitarist Mana's own record label, Midi:Nette. The first press edition, limited to 5000 copies, came in a plastic slipcase with an additional "Visual Arts Booklet".

The theme of the album is "based on the story of vampires, taking a scalpel to the human world from the vampire's point of view", which also became the concept of their live performances before their major label debut.

Track listing
Except for Track 7, all the songs subtitles are only included in the lyrics sheet.

Personnel
 Gackt – vocals, piano
 Mana – synth guitar, sequence programming
 Közi – synth guitar, sequence programming
 Yu~ki – bass
 Kami – drums, percussion
 Takeshi Kanazawa – violin on tracks 2, 5 and 8
 Mayumi Maruo – chorus, photography
 "Patch" Kitaguchi – recording, mixing
 Yōhei Shimada - Sound advisor, piano tuner

References

1996 albums
Malice Mizer albums